Vaidyanatha Jyotirlinga temple, also known as Baba Baidyanath dham and Baidyanath dham is one of the twelve Jyotirlingas, the most sacred abodes of Shiva. It is located in Deoghar in the Santhal Parganas division of the state of Jharkhand, India. It is a temple complex consisting of the main temple of Baba Baidyanath, where the Jyotirlinga is installed, and 21 other temples.

According to Hindu beliefs, the demon king Ravana worshipped Shiva at the current site of the temple to get the boons that he later used to wreak havoc in the world. Ravana offered his ten heads one after another to Shiva as a sacrifice. Pleased with this, Shiva descended to cure Ravana who was injured. As he acted as a doctor, he is referred to as Vaidhya ("doctor"). The temple derives its name from this aspect of Shiva.

Kanwar Yatra (Devanagari: कांवड़ यात्रा) is an annual pilgrimage of devotees of Shiva, known as Kānvarias (कांवड़िया) or "Bhole" (भोले) to Hindu pilgrimage places of Sultanganj in Bihar to fetch holy waters of Ganges River. Millions of participants gather sacred water from the Ganga and carry it across hundreds of miles to dispense as offerings in Baidyanath Temple in Jharkhand.

Foundation and story 

According to the legend, Dashanan Ravana was doing penance on the Himalayas to please Lord Shiva, he was cutting his heads one by one and offering them to the Shivling. After offering 9 heads, when Ravana was about to cut his 10th head, Bholenath was pleased and appeared to him and asked him to ask for a boon - then Ravana asked for a boon to take 'Kamna Linga' to Lanka. Apart from the golden Lanka, Ravana had the power to rule in all the three worlds, as well as imprisoned many gods, Yakshas and Gandharvas and kept them in Lanka. Because of this, Ravana expressed his desire that Lord Shiva should leave Kailash and stay in Lanka, Mahadev fulfilled his wish but also put a condition. He said that if you keep Shivling anywhere on the way, then I will stay there again and will not get up, Ravana accepted the condition, here all the gods got worried after hearing about Lord Shiva leaving Kailash, to solve this problem Everyone went to Lord Vishnu. Then Shri Hari composed the Leela. Lord Vishnu asked Varun Dev to enter Ravana's stomach through Achaman. Therefore, when Ravana came towards Sri Lanka with the Shivling, he felt a small doubt near Deoghar, in such a situation, Ravana went to make a small doubt by giving Shivling to a Baiju named Ahir. It is said that there was Lord Vishnu in the form of Baiju Ahir. Tired of the increasing load of Shivling, Baiju Ahir installed the Shivling on the earth. When Ravana returned, he could not lift the Shivling even after lakhs of efforts. Then he also understood this leela of God and got angry and then went away after sticking his thumb on Shivling. Hiding there, Baiju was watching all this, he felt that this is the way of doing devotion to Baba ji, since then it became a routine for Baiju. One day Baiju was very hungry, when he went home, as soon as he put food in his mouth, Baiju remembered that today, Baiju did not worship Bhole Baba, leaving his food, Baiju went on a tour with sticks, this time as soon as Shivling was attacked. While doing this, Mahadev would have appeared, Mahadev said, Baiju, I am very pleased with your devotion. On seeing Mahadev, Baiju fell at his feet and said Mahadev, I had seen Ravana, if I had done this, I felt that you would have been worshiped like this. Mahadev hugged Baiju and said Baiju you have worshiped me from the heart. From today onwards the world will know you as my highest devotee, your name will be taken before my name and this place will be famous as Baba Baijnath Dham (further improved to Baidyanath Dham). After that the gods like Brahma, Vishnu etc. came and worshiped that Shivling. As soon as Shiva appeared, all the deities established Shivling at the same place and went back to heaven after praising Shiva. Since then, Mahadev resides in Deoghar in the form of 'Kamna Linga'. Here Brahma, Vishnu etc. Gods came and worshiped that Shivling. According to popular belief and folk belief, this Vaidyanath-Jyotirlinga is going to give desired results.

Location of Baidyanath Jyotirlinga

Vaidyanatham Chitabhoomau (1/21-24) and Shivamaha puran Shatarudra Samhita (42/1-4) is the ancient verse that identifies location of Vaidyanth Jyotirlinga. According to which Shri Vaidyanatham is in 'Chitabhoomi'. In Dwadasha jyotirlinga stotram, Adi Sankaracharya has praised Shri Vaidyanath Jyotirlinga location in following verses, before Shivamaha puran Shatarudra Samhita  as following:

Sourashtre Somanadham, cha Sri Shaile Mallikarjunam,
Ujjayinyam Maha Kalam, Omkaram, amaleshwaram,
Paralyam Vaidyanatham, cha Dakinyam Bhimasankaram,
Sethubandhe thu Ramesam, Nagesam thu Darukavane,
Varanasyam thu Viswesam, Trayambakam Gouthami thate,
Himalaye thu Kedaram, Ghushmesam cha Shivalaye,
Ethani Jyothirlingani sayam pratha paden nara,
Saptha janma krutham papam smaranena vinasyathi.

"Parlam Vaidyanatham" as above verses  it is clear"parlam" is location of sri Vaidyanatham.

further discription of "Parlam Vaidyanatham" veres Adi Shankaracharya further evaluate above main verse as below:

Poorvottare prajwalika nidhaane
sada vasantam girija sametam
suraasuraaradhita paada padmam
shri vaidyanaatham tamaham namaami

This states that:  

I salute that Vaidyanatha,
Whose lotus feet are worshipped
By all asuras and devas
And who lives in place of eternal shine,in the north east of (Vaidyanatham) of Chitabhoomi,
along with his consort Parvathi.

Bhavarth in Hindi: 
पूर्वोत्तरे प्रज्वलिकानिधाने सदा वसन्तं गिरिजासमेतम्। सुरासुराराधितपादपद्मं श्रीवैद्यनाथं तमहं नमामि ॥
    
"भावार्थ":

    जो भगवान् शंकर पूर्वोत्तर दिशा में चिताभूमि वैद्यनाथ धाम के अन्दर सदा ही पार्वती सहित विराजमान हैं, और देवता व दानव जिनके चरणकमलों की आराधना करते हैं, उन्हीं ‘श्री वैद्यनाथ’ नाम से विख्यात शिव को मैं प्रणाम करता हूँ ।

Also, Chitabhoomi indicates that, in olden days, this was a funeral place, where corpses are burnt, and post-death ceremonies were performed. This place could have been a center of tantric cults like Kapalika/Bhairava where Lord Shiva is worshipped significantly as shmashaan vaasin (meaning, residing in crematorium), sava bhasma bhushita (meaning, smearing body with ashes of burnt bodies).

The Dvadashalinga Smaranam also mentions its location as the verse is Prachikam Vaidyanatham, i.e., Vaidyanatham is in east (prachi means east). Another version of Dvadasalinga Smaranam mentions its location in the verse Paralyam Vaidyanatham, i.e.,Vaidyanatham is in Parali.The names and the locations of the 12 Jyotirlingas mentioned in the distorted version of Dvadasalinga Smaranam are:

Saurashtre Somanatham cha Shrishaile Mallikarjunam|
Ujjayinya Mahakalam Omkaramamaleshwaram ||
Prajwalayam Vaidyanathancha Dakinyam Bheema Shankaram |
Setu Bandhe tu Raamesham, Naagesham Daarukavane||
Varanasyantu Vishwesham Tryambakam Gautami tate|
Himalaye tu Kedaaram, Ghrishnesham cha shivaalaye||
Etani jyotirlingani, Saayam Praatah Pathennarah|
Sapta Janma Kritam pApam, Smaranena Vinashyati||

Thus, the three temples claiming their shrines as 'real' jyotirlinga of Vaidyanath are
Baidyanath temple at Deoghar, Jharkhand,
Shri Vaijnath Temple at Parli, Maharashtra and
Baijnath temple at Baijnath, Himachal Pradesh.

Bhavishyapurana also describes Baidyanath as follows:

"Narikhande is district abounding in thickets. It lies west of the Dwarikashwari River. It extends along the Panchakuta hills on its west, and approaches Kikta on the north. The forests are very extensive, chiefly of Sakhota, Arjuna and Sal trees with a plentiful addition of brushwood. The district is celebrated for the shrine of Baidyanath. The deity is worshiped by people from all quarters and is the source of every good in the present age."

It is believed that Shiva first manifested himself as a Jyotirlinga on the night of the Aridra Nakshatra, thus the special reverence for the Jyotirlinga. The same shrine of Vaidyanath is considered one of 51 Shakti Peethas, where 'heart' of Sati (goddess) fell, after being broken apart by the Sudarshana Chakra of Lord Vishnu, from the body of Dakshayani (Sati), carried by the lovelorn, distraught Shiva, at the location on which the respective temple is built. Since the heart of Sati fell here, the place is also called as Hardapeetha. Here Sati is worshipped as Jayaa Durga (Victorious Durga) and Lord Bhairava as Vaidyanath or Baidyanath. Dakshayani was reborn as Parvati, daughter of Himaavat, king of the mountains, and his wife, the Devi Mena.

Jyotirlinga

As per Shiv Mahapuran, once Brahma (the Hindu God of creation) and Vishnu (the Hindu God of preservation) had an argument in terms of supremacy of creation.  To test them, Shiva pierced the three worlds as a huge endless pillar of light, the jyotirlinga. Vishnu and Brahma split their ways to downwards and upwards respectively to find the end of the light in either direction. Brahma lied that he found out the end, while Vishnu conceded his defeat. Shiva appeared as the second pillar of light and cursed Brahma that he would have no place in ceremonies while Vishnu would be worshipped until the end of eternity. The jyotirlinga is the supreme partless reality, out of which Shiva partly appears. The jyothirlinga shrines, thus are places where Shiva appeared as a fiery column of light.
 
Originally there were believed to be 64 jyothirlingas while 12 of them are considered to be very auspicious and holy. Each of the twelve jyothirlinga sites take the name of the presiding deity - each considered different manifestation of Shiva. At all these sites, the primary image is lingam representing the beginningless and endless Stambha pillar, symbolizing the infinite nature of Shiva. The twelve jyothirlinga are Somnath in Gujarat, Mallikarjuna at Srisailam in Andhra Pradesh, Mahakaleswar at Ujjain in Madhya Pradesh, Omkareshwar in Madhya Pradesh, Kedarnath in Uttarakhand, Bhimashankar in Maharashtra, Viswanath at Varanasi in Uttar Pradesh, Triambakeshwar in Maharashtra, Baidyanath at Deoghar in Jharkhand, Nageswar at Dwarka in Gujarat, Rameshwar at Rameswaram in Tamil Nadu and Grishneshwar at Maharashtra.

Description of Temple
The Maa Parvati temple is tied up with the main temple, with huge red sacred threads which is unique and worthy of reverence, showing the unity of Shiva and Shakti. According to the stories narrated in the Shiva Purana, the holy Baidyanath temple resembles the unity of souls and thus fits marriage for Hindus.

The nearest railway station is Jasidih railway station, which is 7 km from Vaidyanath temple. Jasidh is 311 km from Howrah/Sealdah on Patna route. On a normal day, the worshipping of Baidyanath Jyotirlingam begins at 4 AM. The temple doors open at this time. At 4:00 am the "patt" of Baidyanath Jyotirlingam opens and for the very sharp 15 minutes the "Panda" (priest's families) offer Kacha Jal to LORD SHIVA, during 4:15am to 5:40 am, the Head priest worships with Shodashopachar. Locals also call it Sarkari Pooja. Then the devotees begin their worship of the Shivalinga. The most interesting tradition is that priests of the temple pour kuchcha Jal upon the lingam first, and later on, the pilgrims pour water and offer flowers and Bilva leaf, upon the lingam. The Puja rituals continue until 3.30 PM. After this, the temple doors are closed. In the evening at 6 PM the doors are opened again for devotees/ pilgrims and the process of worshipping begins again. At this time Shringar Puja takes place. The temple closes at 9:00 pm on a normal day, but during Holy Shravan month, the timings are extended. Unlike Somnath or Rameshwaram or Srisailam, here the devotees can get satisfaction by offering Abhishek themselves on Jyotirlinga.
The devotee can also buy Peda as prasad from Babadham. Peda is a local sweet and is the speciality of Deoghar. Babadham has a regular and well-maintained office to accept offerings and donations.

The Matsyapuran narrates the place as Arogya Baidyanathitee, the holy place where Shakti lives and assists Shiva in freeing people from incurable diseases. This whole area of Deoghar was under the rule of the Kings of Gidhaur who were much attached with this temple. Raja Bir Vikram Singh founded this princely state in 1266. In 1757 after the Battle of Plassey the officers of the East India Company paid their attention to this temple. An English man, Keating was sent to look at the administration of the temple. Mr. Keating, the first English collector of Birbhum, took interest in the administration of the temple. In 1788, under Mr. Keating's order Mr. Hesilrigg, his assistant, who was probably the first English man to visit the holy city, set out to supervise personally the collection of the pilgrim offerings and dues. Later, when Mr. Keating himself visited Babadham, he was convinced and forced to abandon his policy of direct interference. He handed over the full control of the temple to the hands of the high priest.

List of High Priest
1.  Mukund Jha

2.  Judhan Jha

3   Mukund Jha (Second time)

4.  Chikku Jha

5.  Raghunath jha (in 1586 AD)

6.  Chikku Jha (Second time)

7.  Mallu

8.  Semkaran Jha Sarewar

9.  Sadanand

10. Chandrapani

11. Ratnapani

12. Jay Nath Jha

13. Vaamdev

14. Yadunandan

15. Tikaram (until 1762 AD)

16. Devakinandan (until 1782 AD)

17. Narayan Datt (until 1791 AD)

18. Ramdatt (until 1810 AD)

19. Anand Datt Ojha (until 1810 AD)

20. Parama Nand (1810-1823 AD)

21. Sarva Nand (1823-1836 AD)

22. Ishwari Nand Ojha (until 1876)

23. Shailaja Nand Ojha (until 1906)

24. Umesha Nand Ojha (until 1921)

25. Bhavpreeta Nand Ojha (1928-1970)

26. Ajita Nand Ojha (6 July 2017- 22
Mai 2018)

27. Gulab Nand Ojha (from 22 Mai 2018)

Connectivity
Nearest Airport: Deoghar Airport

Nearest Railway Station: Deoghar and Jasidih

Shravan Mela and Kanwar yatra 

Millions of pilgrims visit this shrine every year. It is famous for the mela of Shraavana (a month of the Hindu calendar), between July and August. About 8 to 10 million devotees visit the place from various parts of India and offer holy water of Ganges to the deity collected from Sultanganj, which is almost 108 km from Deoghar and Baidyanath. The water is also brought by the Kānvarias, who carry the water in Kavadi, and walk all the distance, on barefoot. You will find large crowds walking all the way carrying water. An unbroken line of people in saffron-dyed clothes stretches over the full 108 km for the month. The pilgrims are called Dak Bam and they do not stop even once in their journey from Sultangunj, located at Bhagalpur district to Vaidyanath. Pilgrims to the temple later visit the Basukinath temple.

See also
 Famous Hindu yatras
 Hindu pilgrimage sites in India
 List of Hindu festivals
 Padayatra
 Ratha Yatra
 Tirtha
 Tirtha and Kshetra
 Baidyanath Dham (Nepal)

References

Notes

.

External links
Official Website of Baba Baidyanath Temple Management Board

Jyotirlingas
Shiva temples in Jharkhand
Deoghar
Shiva temples in India
Hindu temples in Jharkhand
Tourist attractions in Jharkhand
Temples in India
Hindu temples in Deoghar district